Andalusite is an aluminium nesosilicate mineral with the chemical formula Al2SiO5. This mineral was called andalousite by Delamétehrie, who thought it came from Andalusia, Spain. It soon became clear that it was a locality error, and that the specimens studied were actually from El Cardoso de la Sierra, in the Spanish province of Guadalajara, not Andalusia.

Andalusite is trimorphic with kyanite and sillimanite, being the lower pressure mid temperature polymorph. At higher temperatures and pressures, andalusite may convert to sillimanite. Thus, as with its other polymorphs, andalusite is an aluminosilicate index mineral, providing clues to depth and pressures involved in producing the host rock.

Varieties
The variety chiastolite commonly contains dark inclusions of carbon or clay which form a cruciform pattern when shown in cross-section. This stone was known at least from the sixteenth century, being taken to many European countries, as a souvenir, by pilgrims returning from Santiago de Compostela.

Viridine is a green variety of andalusite in which manganese 3+ substitutes for aluminium, the same change is also responsible for the colour. Kanonaite is a greenish-black mineral related to andalusite and having the approximate composition .

A clear variety found in Brazil and Sri-Lanka can be cut into a gemstone. Faceted andalusite stones give a play of red, green, and yellow colors that resembles a muted form of iridescence, although the colors are actually the result of unusually strong pleochroism.

Occurrence 
Andalusite is a common metamorphic mineral which forms under low pressure and low to high temperatures. The minerals kyanite and sillimanite are polymorphs of andalusite, each occurring under different temperature-pressure regimes and are therefore rarely found together in the same rock. Because of this the three minerals are a useful tool to help identify the pressure-temperature paths of the host rock in which they are found. It is particularly associated with pelitic metamorphic rocks such as mica schist.

Uses 
Andalusite is used as a refractory in furnaces, kilns and other industrial processes. South Africa possesses by far the largest portion of the world's known andalusite deposits.

See also 
 List of minerals

References 

Aluminium minerals
Nesosilicates
Orthorhombic minerals
Minerals in space group 58
Industrial minerals